Events from the year 1739 in Denmark.

Incumbents
 Monarch – Christian VI
 Prime minister – Johan Ludvig Holstein-Ledreborg

Events
 28 November  Hørsholm is incorporated as a markeet town.

Undated
 Johan Ludvig Holstein constructs Ledrebrog's new main building near Lejre.

Births

Deaths

31 March – Magnus Berg, woodcarver, sculptor, painter (born 1666).

References

 
1730s in Denmark
Denmark
Years of the 18th century in Denmark